"Black Orchids" is a Nero Wolfe mystery novella by Rex Stout, first published in abridged form as "Death Wears an Orchid" in the August 1941 issue of The American Magazine. It first appeared in book form in the short-story collection Black Orchids, published by Farrar & Rinehart in 1942.

Plot summary

Millionaire orchid fancier Lewis Hewitt has hybridized three black orchid plants in his Long Island greenhouse. Nero Wolfe is wild to have one, so he and Archie Goodwin visit New York's annual flower show, where Hewitt's orchids are on exhibit. One of the other exhibits features a daily performance by a young couple miming a summer picnic. The woman, Anne Tracy, attracts the attentions of Archie, Hewitt, and a young exhibitor named Fred Updegraff. 

During Wolfe's visit to the show, Anne's picnic partner Harry Gould is killed, shot in the head by a gun concealed in the foliage. The gun's trigger is attached to a long string that reaches to a hallway well behind the exhibit.

After a little inquiry, Wolfe shows Hewitt how his walking stick was used to pull the string and fire the shot that killed Gould. Hewitt is horrified by the prospect of the publicity that would ensue should his part in the shooting, however indirect and unwitting, become known. Wolfe offers Hewitt this arrangement: in exchange for all three black orchid plants, the only ones in existence, Wolfe will solve the murder and deliver the criminal to the police, without publicly disclosing Hewitt's connection to the crime. Hewitt terms it blackmail, but submits.

Earlier, Archie had noticed a woman waiting in the hallway behind the exhibit, at around the time that the murderer would have been deploying the string. He now finds her in the crowd that's gawking at the murder scene. Archie steals her handbag, removes it to the men's room, searches it for identification, and learns her name (Rose Lasher) and address. He returns the handbag to her – all without Rose or anyone else noticing.

The police want to know more about her and, finishing their questions, they let her go — but surreptitiously follow her. The police lose her trail but Archie knows her home address, where she has been living with Harry Gould. He arrives at Rose's apartment just as she is about to flee the city, and takes her to Wolfe's house. There Archie searches her suitcase and finds some printed matter that Rose cannot or will not explain: a clipping of an article by Hewitt on Kurume yellows, a plant disease that is fatal to broadleaf evergreens; a postcard to Rose from Harry, postmarked Salamanca, New York (in the western part of the state); and a work order from a garage, also in Salamanca.

Wolfe gets Rose to discuss some of Gould's unsavory qualities. Wolfe learns that although Gould was employed as a gardener, he suddenly acquired a bank account containing several thousand dollars and what Miss Lasher terms "a big roll of bills." From his general awareness of horticultural events, Wolfe knows that an attack of Kurume yellows devastated a plantation of a new hybrid of broadleaf evergreens, about eighty miles west of Salamanca and owned by Updegraff Nurseries. The same disease has affected the exhibit in which Anne and Gould were featured; W. G. Dill, one owner of the company sponsoring it, had asked Wolfe to investigate the source.

Weighing all this information, Wolfe assembles the principals in the fumigation chamber of his plant rooms. He accuses Hewitt of conspiring with Gould to infect the plantations of rival growers, and of killing Gould after the latter began to blackmail him. When a telephone call comes in for Hewitt, Wolfe sends Dill to answer it instead, closes the chamber door, and informs the rest of the group that Dill, not Hewitt, is the murderer. Dill is later found dead in the plant rooms, having turned on the flow of fumigation gas with the intent to kill everyone inside the chamber; however, Wolfe had anticipated this action and diverted the gas to fill the plant rooms instead. 

Wolfe tells Cramer that Anne had previously confirmed his suspicions of Gould's and Dill's activities. He keeps the black orchids, but Cramer is unimpressed by their appearance, saying that he prefers geraniums. The orchids have a cameo role in the second novella in this collection, "Cordially Invited to Meet Death."

Cast of characters
Nero Wolfe — The private investigator
Archie Goodwin — Wolfe's assistant (and the narrator of all Wolfe stories)
Anne Tracy — Secretary at the Rucker and Dill nursery company, and the star of the company's Flower Show exhibit
Harry Gould — Greenhouse man at Rucker and Dill, the exhibit's co-star, and murder victim
W. G. Dill — Their employer
Fred Updegraff — Nursery owner, exhibitor, and Miss Tracy's would-be beau
Rose Lasher — Harry Gould's live-in girlfriend
Lewis Hewitt — Wealthy owner and exhibitor of the only three black orchid plants in existence
Inspector Cramer and Sergeant Purley Stebbins — Representing Manhattan Homicide

Publication history

"Black Orchids"
1941, The American Magazine, August 1941, abridged as "Death Wears an Orchid"
1943, The Philadelphia Inquirer, a Gold Seal Novel, January 10, 1943
New York: Lawrence E. Spivak, American Mercury #72, not dated, paperback
1945, Rex Stout Mystery Quarterly #1, May 1945
1950, New York: Avon #256 (as "The Case of the Black Orchids"), 1950, paperback
1967, The Saint Magazine, January 1967
1996, Burlington, Ontario: Durkin Hayes Publishing, DH Audio  December 1996, audio cassette (unabridged, read by Saul Rubinek)

Black Orchids
1942, New York: Farrar & Rinehart, May 21, 1942, hardcover
Contents include "Black Orchids" and "Cordially Invited to Meet Death".
In his limited-edition pamphlet, Collecting Mystery Fiction #9, Rex Stout's Nero Wolfe Part I, Otto Penzler describes the first edition of Black Orchids: "Brick brown cloth, front cover and spine printed with black; rear cover blank. Issued in a brick brown and green pictorial dust wrapper … The first edition has the publisher's monogram logo on the copyright page."
In April 2006, Firsts: The Book Collector's Magazine estimated that the first edition of Black Orchids had a value of between $3,000 and $5,000. The estimate is for a copy in very good to fine condition in a like dustjacket.
1942, Toronto: Oxford University Press, 1942, hardcover
1942, New York: Detective Book Club #5, August 1942, hardcover
1943, London: Collins Crime Club, July 5, 1943, hardcover
1943, New York: Grosset & Dunlap, 1943, hardcover
1945, Cleveland, Ohio: World Publishing Company, a Tower Book, March 1945, hardcover
1946, New York: Avon #95, 1946, paperback
1963, New York: Pyramid (Green Door) #R-917, September 1963, paperback
1992, New York: Bantam Crimeline  May 1992, trade paperback
1996, Burlington, Ontario: Durkin Hayes Publishing, DH Audio, "Black Orchids"  December 1996, audio cassette (unabridged, read by Saul Rubinek)
1998, Burlington, Ontario: Durkin Hayes Publishing, DH Audio  August 1998, audio cassette (unabridged, read by David Elias), "Cordially Invited to Meet Death"
2009, New York: Bantam Dell Publishing Group (with The Silent Speaker)  August 25, 2009, trade paperback
2010, New York: Bantam Crimeline  June 30, 2010, e-book

Notes

References

External links

1941 short stories
Nero Wolfe short stories
Works originally published in The American Magazine